Players and pairs who neither have high enough rankings nor receive wild cards may participate in a qualifying tournament held one week before the annual Wimbledon Tennis Championships.

Seeds

  Alexandra Stevenson (qualified)
  Elena Dementieva (qualifying competition, lucky loser)
  Miriam Schnitzer (first round)
  Nana Miyagi (second round)
  Patricia Wartusch (first round)
  Anna Földényi (qualified)
  Anca Barna (first round)
  Tathiana Garbin (second round)
  Elena Makarova (second round)
  Surina de Beer (second round)
  Tina Pisnik (first round)
  Florencia Labat (first round)
  Seda Noorlander (qualified)
  Jelena Dokic (qualified)
  Nadia Petrova (qualified)
  Adriana Gerši (first round)

Qualifiers

  Alexandra Stevenson
  Erika deLone
  Kim Clijsters
  Jelena Dokic
  Linda Wild
  Nadia Petrova
  Anna Földényi
  Seda Noorlander

Lucky loser
  Elena Dementieva

Qualifying draw

First qualifier

Second qualifier

Third qualifier

Fourth qualifier

Fifth qualifier

Sixth qualifier

Seventh qualifier

Eighth qualifier

External links

1999 Wimbledon Championships on WTAtennis.com
1999 Wimbledon Championships – Women's draws and results at the International Tennis Federation

Women's Singles Qualifying
Wimbledon Championship by year – Women's singles qualifying
Wimbledon Championships